Puszno Godowskie  is a village in the administrative district of Gmina Opole Lubelskie, within Opole Lubelskie County, Lublin Voivodeship, in eastern Poland.

References

Puszno Godowskie